Semerenko is a surname. Notable people with the surname include:

 Valentyna Semerenko (born 1986), Ukrainian biathlete
 Vita Semerenko (born 1986), Ukrainian biathlete

Ukrainian-language surnames